PCMC may refer to:
4-Chloro-3-methylphenol, a disinfectant
Pimpri-Chinchwad Municipal Corporation, the municipal corporation of the Indian city of Pimpri-Chinchwad